Diaphus kapalae, the Kapala lanternfish, is a species of lanternfish found in the Southwest Pacific Ocean.

Etymology
The fish is named  in honor of the fisheries research vessel Kapala, which has collected numerous specimens off the coast of New South Wales, including the type specimen of this species.

References

Myctophidae
Taxa named by Basil Nafpaktitis
Taxa named by Don A. Robertson
Taxa named by John Richard Paxton
Fish described in 1995
Fish of the Pacific Ocean